In mathematics, exponential equivalence of measures is how two sequences or families of probability measures are "the same" from the point of view of large deviations theory.

Definition
These two families are said to be exponentially equivalent if there exist
 a one-parameter family of probability spaces ,
such that

 for each ,

Properties
The main use of exponential equivalence is that as far as large deviations principles are concerned, exponentially equivalent families of measures are indistinguishable.

References

  (See section 4.2.2)

Asymptotic analysis
Probability theory
Equivalence (mathematics)